After their success in Division Three the previous year, Boston were billed as promotion favourites, as they had bolstered their squad for the 2004–05 Football League Two, Boston's third consecutive season in the Football League, after promotion in 2002.

Hectic pre-season matches in a packed schedule saw Boston play a selection of local and national teams, including Rotherham United, Sheffield United, Stamford A.F.C. and local rivals Boston Town. Boston played a very lucrative friendly against a Newcastle United XI at York Street, bringing in a crowd of 3349. The Pilgrims comfortably won 4–0, with Martin Carruthers scoring a hat-trick. The game saw a number of Newcastle's future players at the game, including Michael Chopra, Matty Pattison and goalkeeper Tony Caig.

A notable addition to the Pilgrims' squad was former England international Paul Gascoigne, who joined the club on a short-term basis, as a player-coach. Assigned his famous number 19 shirt for the forthcoming season, Gascoigne was presented in front of the media against his former club Newcastle, a game which he started. Gascoigne went on to make 10 appearances for Boston before leaving in October.

This season for Boston was also notable for their progression in the Carling Cup. Playing Champtionship side Luton Town was at first a daunting task for United, but they were in form following two consecutive league wins against Chester and Cambridge. The Pilgrims overcame Luton, winning 4–3, setting up a tie with Premier League club Fulham. 5373 people attended the second round tie at York Street, but Boston lost 4–1 at the hands of Chris Coleman's men. Playing for Fulham were many international players, such as Luis Boa Morte, Steed Malbranque, Brian McBride and Tomasz Radzinski.

It was a season of mixed results, with the team only winning 14 of a possible 46 league games. This saw Boston finish in a comfortable 16th position, but this was disappointing to the fans, considering what many had predicted in August.

End Of Season Squad

Left the club

See also

Boston United F.C. seasons
Bos